Peabody School may refer to:

 Peabody Building of the Peabody-Williams School, Petersburg, VA, listed on the NRHP in Virginia
 Peabody College for Teachers, Nashville, TN, listed on the NRHP in Tennessee
 Peabody Demonstration School, Nashville, TN
 Peabody School (Charlottesville, Virginia)
 Peabody School (Eastman, Georgia), listed on the NRHP in Georgia
 Peabody School (Haverhill, Massachusetts), listed on the NRHP in Massachusetts
 Little Rock Central High School (formerly Peabody School (1890–1905)), Little Rock, Arkansas

See also
 Peabody Elementary School (disambiguation)
 Peabody High School (disambiguation)
 Peabody Institute, Johns Hopkins University, a conservatory and university-preparatory school in Baltimore, Maryland,